In mathematics, Viviani's curve, also known as Viviani's window, is a figure eight shaped space curve named after the Italian mathematician Vincenzo Viviani. It is the intersection of a sphere with a cylinder that is tangent to the sphere and passes through two poles (a diameter) of the sphere (see diagram). Before Viviani this curve was studied by Simon de La Loubère and Gilles de Roberval.

The orthographic projection of Viviani's curve onto a plane perpendicular to the line through the crossing point and the sphere center is the lemniscate of Gerono, while the stereographic projection is a hyperbola or the lemniscate of Bernoulli, depending on which point on the same line is used to project. 

In 1692 Viviani solved the following task: Cut out of a half sphere  (radius ) two windows, such that the remaining surface (of the half sphere) can be squared, i.e. a square with the same area can be constructed using only compasses and ruler.

Equations 
 
In order to keep the proof for squaring simple,
 the sphere has the equation 
and
 the cylinder is upright with equation .
The cylinder has radius  and is tangent to the sphere at point

Properties of the curve

Floor plan, elevation and side plan 

The orthogonal projection of the intersection curve onto the 
 --plane is the circle with equation 
 --plane the parabola with equation 
 --plane the algebraic curve with the equation

Parametric representation 

Representing the sphere by 
 
and setting  yields the curve 
 

One easily checks that the spherical curve fulfills the equation of the cylinder. But the boundaries allow only the red part (see diagram) of Viviani's curve. The missing second half (green) has the property 

The area of the upper right part of Viviani's window (see diagram) can be calculated by an integration:

Rational Bezier representation 
The quarter of Viviani's curve that lies in the all-positive quadrant of 3D space cannot be represented exactly by a regular Bezier curve of any degree.

However, it can be represented exactly by a 3D rational Bezier segment of degree 4, and there is an infinite family of rational Bezier control points generating that segment.

One possible solution is given by the following five control points:

The corresponding rational parametrization is:

Relation to other curves 
 The 8-shaped elevation (see above) is a Lemniscate of Gerono.
 Viviani's curve is a special Clelia curve. For a Clelia curve the relation between the angles is 

Subtracting 2× the cylinder equation from the sphere's equation and applying completing the square leads to the equation

which describes a right circular cone with its apex at
, the double point of Viviani's curve. Hence
 Viviani's curve can be considered not only as the intersection curve of a sphere and a cylinder but also as 
a) the intersection of a sphere and a cone and as
b) the intersection of a cylinder and a cone.

See also
Sphere-cylinder intersection

References

External links
Berger, Marcel: Geometry. II. Translated from the French by M. Cole and S. Levy. Universitext. Springer-Verlag, Berlin, 1987.
 Berger, Marcel: Geometry. I. Translated from the French by M. Cole and S. Levy. Universitext. Springer-Verlag, Berlin, 1987. xiv+428 pp. 

 

Spherical curves